Sunita Bhuyan is an Indian violinist. She began her musical career at the age of 8. Music has always been an integral part of her life; her mother, Minoti Khaund, was a Hindustani classical violinist. Bhuyan was initially trained by her mother and later learned from the Pandit V. G. Jog. Her Album "Bihu Strings" by Times Music is the first album of folk on Violin in India.

Awards received 

 Priyadarshini Award for excellence,
 Giants International Award for women,
 REX Karmaveer global awards,
 An award from Pope Francis at the Vatican city for her work on music therapy with underprivileged children, cancer patients and people with disability.

References

Indian violinists
1970 births
Women violinists
Living people